Meropenem/vaborbactam, sold under the brand name Vabomere among others, is a combination medication used to treat complicated urinary tract infections, complicated abdominal infections, and hospital-acquired pneumonia. It contains meropenem, a β-lactam antibiotic, and vaborbactam, a β-lactamase inhibitor. It is given by injection into a vein.

Common side effects include headache, inflammation at the site of injection, nausea, diarrhea, liver inflammation, and low blood potassium. Severe side effects may include anaphylaxis, seizures, and Clostridium difficile-associated diarrhea. It is unclear if use during pregnancy is safe. Meropenem works by blocking the construction of the bacterial cell wall while vaborbactam blocks the breakdown of meropenem by some β-lactamases.

The combination was approved for medical use in the United States in 2017 and Europe in 2018. It is on the World Health Organization's List of Essential Medicines.

Medical uses
It is used to treat complicated urinary tract infections, complicated abdominal infections, and hospital-acquired pneumonia.

In a study of 545 adults with complicated urinary tract infections, 98 percent of adults treated with Vabomere compared with about 94 percent of adults treated with piperacillin/tazobactam were cured defined as improvement in symptoms and a negative urine culture. About seven days after completing treatment, roughly 77 percent of adults treated with Vabomere compared with about 73 percent of those treated with piperacillin/tazobactam had resolved symptoms and a negative urine culture.

Children
Successful bacteremia clearance in a child has been reported using a meropenem-vaborbactam dose of 40 mg/kg every 6 hours given over 3 hours. It attained 100% of meropenem serum concentrations above the minimum inhibitory concentration for at least 40% of the dosing interval.

Side effects
The most common adverse reactions were headache, infusion site reactions and diarrhea. Serious risks include allergic reactions and seizures and Meropenem/vaborbactam should not be used in people with severe allergic reactions to penicillins.

History
Rempex Pharmaceuticals developed the drug. It was designated as a "qualified infectious disease product" under the Generating Antibiotic Incentives Now (GAIN) title of the FDA Safety and Innovation Act and therefore received priority review.  

In August 2017, the US Food and Drug Administration approved it to treat complicated urinary tract infections and pyelonephritis.

References

External links
 

Carbapenem antibiotics
Combination antibiotics
Beta-lactamase inhibitors
World Health Organization essential medicines
Wikipedia medicine articles ready to translate